The Romanian Evangelical Alliance is an evangelical Christian organization that comprises three distinguished denominations that are in full communion with each other: the Baptist Union of Romania, Apostolic Church of God and Christian Evangelical Church of Romania.

History

Formation
The alliance was directly inspired by the Evangelical Alliance and the National Association of Evangelicals, who managed to unite multiple Christian denominations both in UK and United States with the hope of preaching the gospel to more people. Established in 1990 from the initiative of multiple evangelical religious figures, most notably Baptist pastor Iosif Țon, the idea of a Romanian Evangelical Alliance took birth in January, after the fall of communism, when Iosif first came back in the country after years of exile. On 25 April, alongside Silviu Cioată, Vasile Taloș and Emil Bulgăr, Iosif organised a meeting between all evangelical leaders. Together they analysed the doctrinal differences and after realising how few they were, decided to form the union.
The first congress of the alliance was held in October 1990 at the Palace Hall in Bucharest.

List of Presidents
This is a list of the Alliance presidents since its formation:

Doctrinal differences
Although similar in their beliefs, the three Romanian evangelical denominations are divided over 3 major aspects of the Bible that define them as being their own denomination:

Eschatology
Pentecostals and evangelical Christians believe in the rapture of the Church prior to the Second Coming. After the great tribulation, Jesus will descend in Jerusalem and reign in the Earth for 1000 years before the Final Judgment.

On the other hand, Baptists are generally amillennials, believing that Jesus's "1000 years reign" from Revelation 20 is metaphorical. They believe that the universal resurrection and Final Judgment will happen at the same time with Jesus's second coming and, immediately after, the Eternal Kingdom will be established.

Ecclesiology
While Pentecostals and Baptists ordain their ministers, the evangelical Christians have lay ministers.

Spiritual gifts
Pentecostals believe that spiritual gifts are still present in the church today. Those include signs and wonders, prophecy, healing and speaking in tongues. The latter is also seen as an indicator of Baptism with the Holy Spirit.

Baptists and evangelical Christians are officially cessationists considering that speaking in tongues was a power that ceased with the end of the Apostolic Age.

References

Evangelicalism in Romania
National evangelical alliances
1990 establishments in Romania
Christian organizations established in 1990